The Coupe de France 1993–94 was its 77th edition. It was won by AJ Auxerre.

Round of 16

Quarter-finals

Semi-finals

Final

Topscorer
Gerald Baticle (5 goals)

References

French federation
1993–94 Coupe de France at ScoreShelf.com

1993–94 in French football
1993-94
1993–94 domestic association football cups